Fiona Ruttelle is an Australian actress, singer, model and artist. She received an AFI Award nomination for "Best Actress in a Lead Role" for her role in the Richard Lowenstein directed movie Say a Little Prayer. She was a member of Freaked Out Flower Children, a band that released an album Love In (1991). The album included the single "Spill the Wine", which reached no. 31 on the Australian single charts.

Movies 
Cruel Youth short (1989)
Say a Little Prayer (1993)

Television 
Rockwaves
Countdown Revolution

References 

 Australian Playboy, July 1992
 Say a Little Prayer press kit
 
 Australian Film Commission

External links 
 

Australian women singers
Australian film actresses
Australian musicians
Living people
Australian female models
Year of birth missing (living people)